The Grammy Award for Best Jazz Vocal Performance, Duo or Group was presented from 1982 to 1990.

Years reflect the year in which the Grammy Awards were presented, for works released in the previous year.

Recipients

References

Grammy Awards for jazz